Las Mercedes Airport  is an airstrip serving San Javier, a town in the Maule Region of Chile.

There are hills immediately south of the airport, and more distant rising terrain west and north.

See also

Transport in Chile
List of airports in Chile

References

External links
OpenStreetMap - Las Mercedes
OurAirports - Las Mercedes
FallingRain - Las Mercedes Airport
Las Mercedes Airport World Airport Codes

Airports in Chile
Airports in Maule Region